Route 18 may refer to:
 One of several highways - see List of highways numbered 18
 One of several public transport routes - see List of public transport routes numbered 18